Cymatosyrinx impolita is a species of sea snail, a marine gastropod mollusk in the family Drilliidae.

Description

Distribution
This species occurs in the demersal zone of the Pacific Ocean off Japan.

References

 Hirohito (emperor of Japan), Kuroda, T.; Habe, T.; Oyama, K. (1971). The Sea Shells of Sagami Bay. Maruzen Co., Tokyo. xix, 1–741 (Japanese text), 1–489 (English text), 1–51 (Index), pls 1–121; Biological laboratory Imperial Household, 1971
 Tucker, J.K. 2004 Catalog of recent and fossil turrids (Mollusca: Gastropoda). Zootaxa 682:1–1295.

External links

impolita
Gastropods described in 1971